Il mare calmo della sera is the debut album by Italian tenor singer Andrea Bocelli, following his win of the Sanremo Festival in 1994, singing his first single and the leading single of the album of the same name. It was certified Gold in the Netherlands.

It was followed by the release of Bocelli, which topped charts all over Europe, in 1995.

History
In 1992, Bocelli's first break as a singer came when Italian rock singer Zucchero Fornaciari auditioned tenors to record a demo version of "Miserere", which he had written. Successfully passing the audition, Bocelli recorded the tune as a duet with Pavarotti, with whom he became very close friends, even singing at his second wedding, and funeral. After touring all over Europe with Zucchero in 1993, Bocelli was then invited to perform at the Pavarotti & Friends, held in Modena in September 1994.

Bocelli was then signed to Sugar Music by Caterina Caselli, who  persuaded him to participate in the Sanremo music festival. He eventually won the newcomer section of the competition in 1994, with "Il mare calmo della sera", a song written by Zucchero for him.

After the Festival, Bocelli released his first studio single also titled Il mare calmo della sera. The single was also included in both of Bocelli's Greatest hits albums, Romanza in 1997, and The Best of Andrea Bocelli: Vivere in 2007.

Track listing
"Il mare calmo della sera"
"Ave Maria no morro"
"Vivere (feat. Gerardina Trovato)"
"Rapsodia"
"La Luna che non c'è"
"Caruso"
"Miserere"
"Panis angelicus"
"Ah, la paterna mano (from Macbeth)"
"E lucevan le stelle (from Tosca)"
"Le fleur que tu m'avais jetée (from Carmen)"
"L'anima ho stanca (from Adriana Lecouvreur)"
"Sogno"

Charts

Weekly charts

Year-end charts

Certifications and sales

References

External links
 Bocelli on Ultratop.be

Andrea Bocelli albums
1994 debut albums
Classical crossover albums
PolyGram albums